James Efflo Tyrer (February 25, 1939 – September 15, 1980) was an American professional football player who was an offensive tackle in the American Football League (AFL) for the Dallas Texans/Kansas City Chiefs. He also played in the National Football League (NFL) for the Chiefs and the Washington Redskins.

In 1980, Tyrer murdered his wife, and then committed suicide.

College career
Born and raised in Newark, Ohio, Tyrer played college football at nearby Ohio State University under head coach Woody Hayes, and earned All-America honors.

Professional career
Tyrer signed with the American Football League's Dallas Texans in 1961. He played 13 years with that franchise (180 consecutive games), which became the Kansas City Chiefs in 1963, helping set the standard for his position at left offensive tackle. His 14th and final season was with the Washington Redskins under head coach George Allen, who preferred veteran players. Tyrer was traded from the Chiefs in late August 1974 for three draft picks.

Tyrer was named AFL Offensive Lineman of the Year in 1969. He and Ed Budde at guard made a powerful left side. In Super Bowl IV, Tyrer and Budde opened holes for Chiefs running backs against the Minnesota Vikings' opposing defensive linemen Jim Marshall and Alan Page, respectively, gaining 151 yards on 42 carries (3.6 yards per attempt) and 122 net passing yards in the team's upset 23–7 victory.

Tyrer was an anchor of Texans/Chiefs' line and was selected as The Sporting News'' AFL All-League tackle eight consecutive years, from 1962 through 1969. He was an AFL Western Division All-Star seven times, in 1962, 1963, 1964, 1965, 1966, 1968 and 1969 before also capturing a pair of All-AFC accolades in 1970–71. His efforts in the upstart league would result in his selection to the American Football League All-Time Team.

At the retirement press conference for former Chief linemate Dave Hill in Kansas City in June 1975, Tyrer also announced his retirement.

Family
Tyrer's sons, Brad and Jason, went on to college football careers in the Big Eight Conference. Brad played for Nebraska under head coach Tom Osborne from 1983–1988, starting his junior and senior seasons. Tyrer and the Blackshirts defense led Nebraska to a win over LSU in the 1987 Sugar Bowl, a close loss to Florida State in the 1988 Fiesta Bowl, and a Big Eight title in 1988 and an appearance in the 1989 Orange Bowl. Jason was a defensive end for Kansas under head coach Glen Mason from 1988 to 1992.

After football
Remaining in the Kansas City area following his retirement, Tyrer turned down an opportunity to serve as a scout for the Chiefs. He then spent the next three years as a salesman before tiring of the constant travel and investing in a tire business. However, a mild winter proved to be financially disastrous for Tyrer, who moved on to work for Amway.

Death
This series of business misfortunes culminated in the early hours of September 15, 1980, when Tyrer shot and killed his wife Martha, then died by suicide by turning the gun on himself. The day before, he had attended a Chiefs game at Arrowhead Stadium with his ten-year-old son Jason.

See also
 List of American Football League players

References

External links
 

1939 births
1980 deaths
American football offensive tackles
American murderers
Dallas Texans (AFL) players
Kansas City Chiefs players
Ohio State Buckeyes football players
Washington Redskins players
American Football League All-Star players
American Football League All-League players
American Conference Pro Bowl players
American Football League All-Time Team
Sportspeople from Newark, Ohio
Players of American football from Ohio
Murder–suicides in Missouri
Suicides by firearm in Missouri
American Football League players
1980 suicides